The Edinburg Consolidated Independent School District (ECISD) is a school district headquartered in the city of Edinburg, Texas, United States Est. 1909.

The district has approximately 4,540 employees including over 2,600 certified professionals, 900 paraprofessionals, 80 counselors, 40 librarians, 45 nurses, 870 Food Service/Maintenance& Facilities Workers, and 200 bus drivers. The superintendent is Rene Gutierrez. As for students, the peak enrollment for the 2013/2014 school year was 33,412, and the district continues to grow at a rate of approximately 5% annually.

In 2009, the school district was rated "academically acceptable" by the Texas Education Agency.

The school district's police force of 78 sworn police officers, 30 security officers and three K9 officers includes a SWAT team equipped with military surplus gear acquired under the Department of Defense Excess Property Program.

Territorial limits 
The district encompasses  of land extending north of the city to the end of Hidalgo County. Almost all of the city of Edinburg is served by ECISD.

In addition, small portions of the city of McAllen and several unincorporated Hidalgo County communities are served by ECISD. The unincorporated Hidalgo County communities served by ECISD include:
 Cesar Chavez
 Doolittle
 Faysville
 La Blanca
 Lopezville (partial)
 Murillo (formerly Nurillo)
 San Carlos
 Linn (formerly San Manuel-Linn)

Schools 

The physical campuses of the ECISD include 4 High Schools, 7 Middle Schools, 31 Elementary Schools, and 3 Alternative Campus.

High schools
 Edinburg High School
 Edinburg North High School
 Johnny G. Economedes High School
 Robert Vela High School

Middle schools
 B.L. Garza Middle School
 Francisco Barrientes Middle School
 Brewster Middle School
 Harwell Middle School
 Longoria Middle School
 Memorial Middle School
 South Middle School
-Barrientes Middle School is the only school named after a living veteran.

Elementary schools
 Austin Elementary
2017 National Blue Ribbon School
 Avila Elementary
 Betts Elementary
 Brewster School
 Cano-Gonzalez Elementary
 Canterbury Elementary
 Cavazos Elementary
 Cayetano Elementary
 Crawford Elementary
 De Escandon Elementary
 De la Vina Elementary
 De Zavala Elementary
 Eisenhower Elementary
 Esparza Elementary
 Flores-Zapata Elementary
 Freddy Gonzalez Elementary
 Guerra Elementary
 Hargill Elementary
2018 National Blue Ribbon School
 J.F. Kennedy Elementary
 Thomas Jefferson Elementary
 L.B. Johnson Elementary
 Lee Elementary
 Lincoln Elementary
 Macaria Gorena Elementary
 Magee Elementary
2018 National Blue Ribbon School
 Monte Cristo Elementary
 San Carlos Elementary
 Travis Elementary
 Trevino Elementary
 Truman Elementary
 Villarreal Elementary

Alternative schools
 Edinburg Alternative Education Academy
 Endeavor Academy
 Vision Academy

See also

List of school districts in Texas

References

External links 
 

Education in Edinburg, Texas
School districts in Hidalgo County, Texas
Education in McAllen, Texas